The Assam Tribune is an Indian English daily newspaper published from Guwahati and Dibrugarh, Assam. With over 700,000 copies of current circulation and a readership of over 3 million, it is the highest circulated English daily in northeastern India. The newspaper was founded way back in 1939 in Gauhati.

History 
First published on 4 August 1939 in Gauhati by Radha Govinda Baruah as a weekly newspaper under the editorship of Lakshminath Phookan, it is now published simultaneously from Guwahati and Dibrugarh as a daily. It has a huge readership in Assam and is the most popular newspaper in the North-East India. The Assam Tribune has a wide reach in terms of circulation figures as well as the reliability of the news matter. In 2014 it celebrated the Platinum Jubilee in the presence of India's Prime Minister Mr. Narendra Modi.

The present editor is Prafulla Govinda Baruah, son of Radha Govinda Baruah, and P. J. Baruah is the Executive Editor.

Controversy 
On 28 March 2021, a day after the first phase of polling for the 2021 Assam Legislative Assembly election, the newspaper ran a frontpage ad claiming the BJP would win all the Upper Assam constituencies along with seven other newspapers. The Congress party claimed that the ad was a ploy to “influence and deceive” voters ahead of the remaining phases of the election; a violation of Representation of the People Act, 1951 and Election Commission of India's directives. Speaking on the controversy, editor Prafulla Govinda Baruah told The Telegraph that “The advertisement came in late.”

See also
The Sentinel
Seven Sisters Post

References

English-language newspapers published in India
Newspapers published in Assam
Newspapers established in 1939
1939 establishments in India